Experience is a book of memoirs by the British author Martin Amis.

Publication history
The book was written primarily in response to the 1995 death of Amis's father, the famed author Kingsley Amis, and was first published in 2000.

Serialization
Upon publication, Experience was serialized in the UK's The Guardian in four parts.

Reception
Critical response to Amis's memoir was very warm. The critic James Wood wrote in the Guardian, "Experience is a beautiful, and beautifully strange book, and it is unlike anything one expected. One feared a trough of plaint: either a sad, Gosse-like reckoning with the father; or an angry, journalistic reckoning with those journalists who have hunted Amis from tooth to tooth. But Experience is not quite a memoir, nor is it quite a portrait of his father, nor is it really an autobiography. It is an escape from memoir; indeed, an escape into privacy. In the very book which might, at first glance, seem most exhibitionist, most shamelessly metropolitan, Amis has softly retreated to the provinces of himself. His book often reads like a letter to his family and closest friends. It is sometimes embarrassing to read; the ordinary reader feels voyeuristic, at times almost uninvited, but very moved. What seems at first just gossip and guestlists - sprays of names offered without explanation, diaristic footnotes, a refusal to universalise - soon becomes a kind of tender defiance, as if Amis wanted the book to vibrate with an atmosphere of wounded privacy." Terence Baker, in The Sunday Times, called it a "careful, heartfelt tribute." Jackie Wullschlager, wrote in the Financial Times, "The core here is family, and it is movingly, beautifully, evoked... The raw materials – neurotic, outrageous genius of a father; gorgeous earth-mother Hilly; sophisticated step-mother Elizabeth Jane Howard; stunning girlfriends dropped along the way like a shattering string of pearls; an unknown daughter emerging at 18 – are unbeatable, and Amis makes of them a loving, perceptive, comic portrait."

Awards
Experience was awarded the 2000 James Tait Black Memorial Prize for biography.

See also
Sally Amis

References

2000 non-fiction books
Books by Martin Amis
British memoirs